The Manuscrit du Roi or Chansonnier du Roi ("King's Manuscript" or "King's Songbook" in English) is a prominent songbook compiled towards the middle of the thirteenth century, probably between 1255 and 1260 and a major testimony of European medieval music. It is currently French manuscript no.844 of the Bibliothèque nationale de France. It is known by various sigla, depending on which of its contents are the focus of study: it is troubadour manuscript W, trouvère manuscript M, and motet manuscript R. It was first published by French musicologist Pierre Aubry in 1907 ("Les plus anciens textes de musique instrumentale au Moyen Age").


Background
The manuscript contains more than 600 songs composed for the most part between the late twelfth and early thirteenth century. Some were written by famous trouvères, such as Theobald I of Navarre, Gace Brulé, Guiot de Dijon or Richard de Fournival, but others are anonymous. It contains as an addendum a booklet of songs by King Theobald I of Navarre, sometimes known as manuscript Mt. Around 85% of its material is French, while only 61 songs are by troubadours, in a Frenchified form of Occitan. Of these, 51 have music.

The songbook has close associations with the Principality of the Morea and was most likely created as a gift for William of Villehardouin, Prince of Achaea by Charles of Anjou, the King of Naples and William's father-in-law. By around 1270, it was in Charles' possession. Today, the state of conservation of the collection is bad. Eighteen pages have are missing and several decorative initials have been cut out, but it remains a major testimony of medieval music.

Recordings 
 The Manuscrit du Roi was recorded in 1992 by the Ensemble Perceval, and was published in 1993 by Arion.
 Estampies & Danses Royales by Hespèrion XXI and Jordi Savall (2008)
 Various songs and instrumental pieces from the Manuscrit du Roi feature on the CD Music for a Medieval Prince (2012) recorded by Trouvere Medieval Minstrels.

References

Sources

External links 
 Manuscript 844 on the Gallica project of the Bibliothèque nationale de France.

1250s books
13th-century manuscripts
French music
Bibliothèque nationale de France collections
Medieval music manuscript sources